Bonnavoulin or Bunavullin is a village on the Morvern peninsula in the Highlands of Scotland.

References

Populated places in Lochaber
Morvern